Håvard or Havard is a surname and given name. Notable people with the name include:

Given name:
Håvard Bøkko (born 1987), Norwegian speedskater
Håvard Bjerkeli (born 1977), Norwegian cross country skier
Håvard Flo (born 1970), football player from Norway
Håvard Gimse (born 1966), Norwegian classical pianist from Kongsvinger
Håvard Halvorsen (born 1973), Norwegian football defender
Håvard Holm (1943–2017), Norwegian civil servant
Håvard Homstvedt (born 1976), Norwegian painter
Håvard Jørgensen, songwriter, guitarist and vocalist
Håvard Kjærstad (born 1947), Norwegian businessperson
Håvard Klemetsen (born 1979), Norwegian Nordic combined skier
Håvard Lie (born 1975), retired Norwegian ski jumper
Håvard Lothe (born 1982), Norwegian musician
Håvard Nordtveit (born 1990), Norwegian footballer
Håvard Rem (born 1959), Norwegian author
Håvard Sakariassen (born 1976), Norwegian football striker
Håvard Solbakken (born 1973), Norwegian cross country skier
Håvard Storbæk (born 1986), Norwegian football midfielder
Håvard Tvedten (born 1978), Norwegian handball player
Håvard Tveite (born 1962), Norwegian orienteering competitor
Håvard Vad Petersson (born 1984), Norwegian curler
Håvard Fjær Grip, Norwegian who made the first extraterrestrial helicopter flight

Surname:
Dai Havard (born 1950), British Labour Party politician and Member of Parliament
Floyd Havard (born 1965), British super-featherweight boxing champion
Kenny Havard (born 1971), member of the Louisiana House of Representatives
Michel Havard (born 1967), member of the National Assembly of France
Peter Havard-Williams (1922–1995), Welsh librarian and library educator
René Havard (1923–1987), French film actor
Robert Havard (1901–1985), the physician of C.S. Lewis and his wife Joy Gresham
Valery Havard (1846–1927), career army officer, physician, author, and botanist
William Thomas Havard MC (1889–1956), Welsh First World War military chaplain and rugby union international player

Norwegian masculine given names